Koliwada refers to a colony of Koli rajputs in India. Several places named Koliwada are located across the Mumbai city in India:
 Khar Danda Koliwada
 Guru Tegh Bahadur Nagar Sion Koliwada (formerly known as Koliwada)
 Thane Koliwada
 Juhu Koliwada
 Panvel Koliwada
 Colaba Koliwada
 Trombay Chembur Koliwada
 Worli Koliwada
Juhu , Mora Gaothan Koliwada
 Versova Koliwada
 Diwale Koliwada
 Dharavi Koliwada
 Vasai Koliwada
 Naigaon Koliwada
 Mahim Koliwada
 Koliwada, Madh
BunderPakhadi Koliwada
Ghansoli Koliwada
Gavanpada Koliwada
Malvani Koliwada
Bhandup Koliwada
Mora koliwada

Fish market

A machhi market or fish market is usually located near the entrance of the Koliwada locality, or the nearest bus stand or main road. In Mumbai, very few Koli communities can afford to build dedicated market reserved for Koli fisherfolk, and therefore, most fish markets are open for sellers from other communities as well.

Bandar/Port

A bandar is the sea shore near boat jetty where fishing boats are anchored. Many fishing nets and other accessories are stored around this area. This area usually is open area and also a location for gathering of many folks in special events. In summer, this area is also used for drying out the fish.

See also 
 List of Koli people
 List of Koli states and clans

External links
Dharavi Koliwada

Culture of Maharashtra
Social groups of Maharashtra
Neighbourhoods in Mumbai